Dentipratulum is a genus of fungus in the family Auriscalpiaceae. This is a monotypic genus, containing the single species Dentipratulum bialoviesense.

References

External links

Russulales
Monotypic Russulales genera